WLAZ (89.1 FM) is a non-commercial, listener-supported radio station broadcasting a Spanish Contemporary Christian radio format. Licensed to Kissimmee, Florida, United States, it serves the Kissimmee / St. Cloud area.  The station is currently owned by Pura Palabra Media Group.

External links
 
 
 

LAZ
Kissimmee, Florida
LAZ
Contemporary Christian radio stations in the United States